The National Stadium of Vyronas is located in east Athens, at the foot of Mount Imittos, only 3 km away from central Athens. The stadium is next to the cemetery, in the end of Vyronas.

The stadium was created in an old quarry, so it is also known as the "damaria", which means quarry. It was built in 1990 and belongs to the Municipality of Vyronas. It is the home of Athinaikos. The record attendance is 5,803 for a match between  Athinaikos and Panathinaikos in 1991.  The current seating capacity is 4,340.

External links
Stadium website

Football venues in Greece
Sports venues in Athens
1990 establishments in Greece
Sports venues completed in 1990